The 2000 State of Origin series was the 19th year that the annual three-game series between the Queensland and New South Wales representative rugby league football teams was played entirely under 'state of origin' selection rules. During the 2000 series Gorden Tallis was sent off for calling the referee a cheat, Ryan Girdler amassed an incredible 32 points in one match and New South Wales whitewashed the series in a combined scoreline of 104 to 42 - the biggest gap between the two sides in history.



Game I

After Ryan Girdler had scored a try to level at 16-all which appeared to have included two knock-ons in the lead up, a furious Gorden Tallis confronted Bill Harrigan and was immediately dismissed after calling him a cheat. Six minutes later the Blues took advantage of the extra man for David Peachey to cross out wide and secure a 20-16 win.

Immediately after the game Tallis was summonsed to a judiciary hearing at the ground but was not suspended. He had been to the referee's room beforehand and apologised to Harrigan. Blues prop Robbie Kearns later claimed in the Melbourne Herald Sun newspaper that Tallis was to blame for Queensland's loss by showing poor discipline and that he had let himself and his side down.

Game II

New South Wales' win in the second game secured their first series win since 1997 and the 28-10 scoreline would be their biggest ever winning margin until game III two weeks later.

Game III

New South Wales centre Ryan Girdler produced the performance of his life and the Blues were hailed as the greatest side in Origin history after they demolished Queensland and completed their third clean sweep. Girdler scored three tries and kicked 10 goals from 10 ten attempts for a record 32-point haul during which New South Wales crossed the Queensland line nine times. New South Wales had led 20-10 at half-time but a try to Andrew Johns after the break saw the floodgates open with six Origin records beaten or matched:
 * Biggest winning margin in State of Origin history (since broken by Queensland in Game III, 2015)
 * Most points in an Origin match
 * Most points by an individual in an Origin match
 * Most points by an individual in an Origin series (Girdler, 52)
 * Most goals by an individual in an Origin match
 * Most tries by an individual in an Origin match (Girdler's three equalled Chris Anderson's in 1983 and Kerry Boustead's in 1984)

Teams

New South Wales

Queensland

Aftermath
A major turning point in State of Origin history occurred in this series, when, in the third game, Bryan Fletcher was seen celebrating his try by performing a fake hand grenade aimed towards the Queensland side. The try celebration forced Queensland to change their whole strategy towards Origin and it created a pathway for Queensland to win twelve of sixteen series since 2006 (and a record eight straight between 2006 and 2013). Former Queensland player Wendell Sailor said “As a Queenslander, you never forget that". Queensland Origin great Gorden Tallis had previously spoken about how that try celebration eventually led to a shift in the State of Origin balance of power which saw Queensland win back the Shield in 2001, and retain it in 2002. Former player Matthew Johns claims that the try celebration started a Queensland dynasty. Former Queensland coach Chris Close spoke about Fletcher's try celebration in 2016: "I thought it was disgraceful act and a disgraceful show of disrespect, You would certainly never, ever see that from any Queensland team, It still burns. F---ing oath it does".

See also
2000 NRL season

References

Sources
 Big League's 25 Years of Origin Collectors' Edition, News Magazines, Surry Hills, Sydney

State of Origin series
State of Origin series